Belva can refer to:

People
Belva Davis (born 1932), American journalist
Belva Gaertner (1884–1965), a woman acquitted of murder, the inspiration for the character of Velma Kelly in Chicago
Belva Ann Lockwood (1830–1917), American lawyer, politician and early feminist, first female presidential candidate
Belva Plain (1915–2010), American author

Other uses
Belva, West Virginia, United States, an unincorporated community and census-designated place
Belva, North Carolina, United States, an unincorporated community in Madison County - see List of unincorporated communities in North Carolina
La belva, a 1970 Italian Western film